Below is an episodic synopsis of Together, which consists of 36 episodes and broadcast on MediaCorp Channel 8.

Episodic Synopsis

See also
List of programmes broadcast by MediaCorp Channel 8
Together

Lists of Singaporean television series episodes